Brian Holland (born February 15, 1941) is an American songwriter and record producer, best known as a member of Holland–Dozier–Holland, the songwriting and production team that was responsible for much of the Motown sound, and numerous hit records by artists such as Martha and the Vandellas, The Supremes, The Four Tops, and The Isley Brothers. Holland, along with Lamont Dozier, served as the team's musical arranger and producer. He has written or co-written 145 hits in US and 78 in the UK.

Holland was born in Detroit, Michigan, United States.  For a short time, he partnered with Robert Bateman, and together they were known as "Brianbert", collaborating on such hits as "Please Mr. Postman" for The Marvelettes.

Holland has also had an on-and-off career as a performer.  He released a solo single in 1958 under the name of "Briant Holland". He and longtime friend and future songwriting partner Freddie Gorman were in a short-lived group called the Fidalatones, and he was later (1960–62) a member of the Motown recording act The Satintones, as well as being a member of the Rayber Voices, a quartet that backed up several early Motown recording acts.  He partnered with Lamont Dozier under the name "Holland–Dozier", releasing a lone single for Motown in 1963, then was inactive for a number of years, and was then revived in the early and mid-1970s, scoring a number of medium-sized R&B hits.  Holland resumed his solo recording career in 1974, hitting the charts as a solo artist in 1974 and 1975.

Holland also composed songs for the First Wives Club musical.

References

External links
History of Rock
AllMusic
Brian Holland Interview – NAMM Oral History Library (2004)

1941 births
Musicians from Detroit
African-American songwriters
Record producers from Michigan
Motown artists
Songwriters from Michigan
Living people
21st-century African-American people
20th-century African-American people